

Tynedale was a local government district in Northumberland, England. The district had a resident population of 58,808 according to the 2001 census. The main towns were Hexham, Haltwhistle and Prudhoe. The district contained part of Hadrian's Wall and the southern part of Northumberland National Park.

With an area of  it was the second-largest English district, after the East Riding of Yorkshire. It was bigger than several English counties, including Nottinghamshire, Leicestershire and Hertfordshire. It was also the second-least densely populated district (behind Eden, Cumbria). The district was formed on 1 April 1974, under the Local Government Act 1972, and was a merger of Hexham and Prudhoe urban districts, along with Bellingham, Haltwhistle and Hexham rural districts.

Tynedale was historically a liberty created alongside the county of Hexhamshire by Henry I of England.

The district was abolished as part of the 2009 structural changes to local government in England effective from 1 April 2009 with responsibilities being transferred to Northumberland County Council, a unitary authority. However, the name "Tynedale", which predates the formation of the council, is still widely used for the Tyne Valley area of Northumberland.

Settlements and civil parishes

Tynedale contained the settlements and civil parishes of (towns highlighted in bold):

Acomb, Allendale
Bardon Mill, Bavington, Bellingham, Birtley, Blanchland, Broomhaugh and Riding, Broomley, Bywell
Chollerton, Coanwood, Corbridge, Corsenside
Falstone, Featherstone
Greenhead, Greystead
Haltwhistle, Hartleyburn, Haydon Bridge, Healey, Hedley, Henshaw, Hexham, Hexhamshire, Hexhamshire Low Quarter, Horsley, Humshaugh
Juniper
Kielder, Kirkwhelpington, Knaresdale with Kirkhaugh
Melkridge, Mickley
Newbrough
Otterburn, Ovingham, Ovington
Plenmeller with Whitfield, Prudhoe
Rochester
Sandhoe, Shotley Low Quarter, Simonburn, Slaley, Stocksfield
Tarset, Thirlwall
Wall, Warden, Wark, West Allen, Whitfield, Whittington, Wylam

See also
 Tynedale District Council elections
 Tynedale RFC
 Tynedale FM

References

External links
Statistics about the Tynedale district from the Office for National Statistics census 2001

 
English districts abolished in 2009
Former non-metropolitan districts of Northumberland